Rex William Stewart Jr. (February 22, 1907 – September 7, 1967) was an American jazz cornetist who was a member of the Duke Ellington orchestra.

Career
As a boy he studied piano and violin; most of his career was spent on cornet. Stewart dropped out of high school to become a member of the Ragtime Clowns led by Ollie Blackwell. He was with the Musical Spillers led by Willie Lewis in the early 1920s, then with Elmer Snowden, Horace Henderson, Fletcher Henderson, Fess Williams, and McKinney's Cotton Pickers. In 1933 he led a big band at the Empire Ballroom in New York City. Beginning in 1934, he spent eleven years with the Duke Ellington band. Stewart co-wrote "Boy Meets Horn" and "Morning Glory" and supervised recording sessions by members of the Ellington band. He left Ellington to lead "little swing bands that were a perfect setting for his solo playing." He toured in Europe and Australia with Jazz at the Philharmonic from 1947 to 1951. 

Beginning in the early 1950s, he worked in radio and television and wrote jazz criticism for the Los Angeles Times and the magazines Playboy and DownBeat. The book Jazz Masters of the Thirties  is a selection of his criticism. He lived in upstate New York after purchasing a one hundred year old farmhouse. He hosted a jazz radio program in Troy, New York, and owned a small restaurant for a short time near a drag racing track in Vermont. While living in France, he attended the Le Cordon Bleu school of cooking and dedicated his life to becoming a fine cook. Stewart moved to Los Angeles, California, to be near his children. His son Paul Albert Hardy lived in New York City. While in Los Angeles he reunited with musicians from the Ellington band and played jam sessions in clubs. He was a studio musician for The Steve Allen Show and with George Cole he hosted two radio shows: Dixieland Doings and Things Aint What They Used to Be.

His autobiography, Boy Meets Horn, was published in 1991. He died of a brain hemorrhage in Los Angeles.

Film and TV
He made a cameo appearance in the film Rendezvous in July (1949) directed by Jacques Becker. He also appeared in Hellzapoppin' (1941) and The Sound of Jazz (1957) telecast.

Discography
 Big Jazz with Jack Teagarden (Atlantic, 1953)
 Rex Stewart Plays Duke Ellington with Illinois Jacquet (Grand Award, 1955)
 The Big Challenge with Cootie Williams (Jazztone, 1957)
 Porgy & Bess Revisited with Cootie Williams  (Warner Bros., 1959)
 Chatter Jazz with Dickie Wells (RCA Victor, 1959)
 Henderson Homecoming (United Artists, 1959)
 Rendezvous with Rex (Felsted, 1959)
 The Happy Jazz of Rex Stewart (Swingville, 1960)
 Rex Stewart and the Ellingtonians (Riverside, 1960)
 The Rex Stewart Memorial Album (Prestige, 1969)
 The Irrepressible Rex Stewart with John Dengler (Jazzology, 1980)
 Rex Stewart with the Alex Welsh Band (Jazzology, 2004)

References

1907 births
1967 deaths
American jazz cornetists
Dixieland cornetists
Dixieland trumpeters
Duke Ellington Orchestra members
Musicians from Philadelphia
RCA Victor artists
Swing cornetists
Swing trumpeters
20th-century American musicians
Jazz musicians from Pennsylvania
McKinney's Cotton Pickers members
Riverside Records artists